Ernest or Ernie Lepore (born November 20, 1950) is an American philosopher and cognitive scientist and a professor of philosophy at Rutgers University.

Education and career

Lepore earned his Ph.D. from the University of Minnesota in 1978, and began teaching at the University of Notre Dame before joining the philosophy department at Rutgers University in 1981, where he has taught ever since.

Philosophical work
He is well known for his work on the philosophy of language and mind, sometimes in collaboration with Jerry Fodor, Herman Cappelen and Kirk Ludwig, as well as his work on philosophical logic and the philosophy of Donald Davidson.

Selected publications
Imagination and Convention: Distinguishing Grammar and Inference in Language,  with Matthew Stone (Oxford University Press, 2015)  
Handbook in Philosophy of Language, ed. with B. C. Smith, (Oxford University Press, 2006)
Insensitive Semantics, with Herman Cappelen (2004, Basil Blackwell) 
Donald Davidson: Truth, Meaning, Rationality in Mind,  with Kirk Ludwig (Oxford University Press, 2005)  
Donald Davidson's truth-theoretic Semantics,  with Kirk Ludwig (Oxford University Press, 2007), 
Meaning and Argument, with Sam Cumming (Blackwell, 2000) 
Holism: A Shopper's Guide, with Jerry Fodor (Blackwell, 1991) 
The Compositionality Papers, with Jerry Fodor (Oxford University Press, 2002) 
What Every Student Should Know  with Sarah-Jane Leslie (Rutgers Press, 2002).

References

External links
 Rutgers faculty home page for Dr. Lepore
 Curriculum vitae
 Meaning, truth, language, reality, an interview with 3:AM Magazine

1950 births
20th-century American essayists
20th-century American philosophers
21st-century American essayists
21st-century American philosophers
American logicians
American male essayists
American male non-fiction writers
American philosophy academics
Analytic philosophers
American cognitive scientists
History of logic
Living people
Philosophers of language
Philosophers of logic
Philosophers of mind
Philosophy writers
Rutgers University faculty
University of Minnesota alumni
University of Notre Dame faculty